Čehovini is a small village southeast of Komen in the Littoral region of Slovenia.

References

External links

Čehovini on Geopedia

Populated places in the Municipality of Komen